Peru competed at the 2022 World Athletics Championships in Eugene, United States, from 15 to 24 July 2022. The Peruvian Athletics Sport Federation had initially entered 8 athletes, but ended up competing with 6 of them due to the withdrawals of Jovana de la Cruz and Soledad Torre.

On 15 July 2022, racewalker Kimberly García won the women's 20km race walk, which meant the first world gold medal and the first ever world medal of any kind for Peru at the World Athletics Championships. Seven days later, García won the second gold medal for Peru after winning the women's 35km race walk, an event that made its debut in the World Athletics Championships.

With 2 gold medals, Peru finished its participation in 7th place in the medal table, and was 26th place in the overall placing table with a total of 16 points.

Medalists

Team
On 7 July 2022, the Peruvian Athletics Sport Federation (FDPA) named a team conformed by 11 athletes qualified for the World Athletics Championships, the largest number of athletes that Peru had ever qualified. However, the final entry list published by World Athletics consigned 8 athletes for Peru, with Gladys Tejeda (marathon), Mariluz Andía and Leyde Guerra (both in 20 kilometres walk) being ruled out due to sporting reasons and injuries respectively.

Eventually, Jovana de la Cruz and Soledad Torre (both in marathon) withdrew from the competition due to sporting reasons and physical discomforts respectively, reducing the Peruvian team to 6 athletes.

Results
Peru entered 8 athletes.

Men 
Road events

Field events

Women 
Road events

References

External links
Oregon22｜WCH 22｜World Athletics

Nations at the 2022 World Athletics Championships
Peru at the World Championships in Athletics
2022 in Peruvian sport